The Committee for Melbourne is a non-profit organisation based in Melbourne, Australia. The committee was founded in 1985 to bring together businesses, academia and non-profit organisations for activities, networking, and policy advice to government. Its aim is to keep Melbourne as one of the world's most liveable cities.

Activities
The committee has been involved with a number of major changes to Melbourne, such as the Melbourne Docklands development, and smaller programs such as Melbourne Green Roofs program, Melbourne Open House, Melbourne's  Moving Galleries  and many others.

The outcomes of the Committee for Melbourne come in three categories: private sector collaboration, establishing organisations, and shaping government policy.

Melbourne Achiever Award
The Committee for Melbourne gives the prestigious Melbourne Achiever awards. Past winners have included:

 Rob Adams
 Ruth Bishop
 Mark Burry
 Graeme Clark (doctor)
 Zelman Cowen
 Adam Elliot
 Barry Humphries
 Cathy Freeman
 Andrea Hull
 David de Kretser
 Jesse Martin
 Melbourne Zoo
 Dame Elisabeth Murdoch
 Christine Nixon
 Oarsome Foursome
 Royal Children's Hospital, Melbourne
 Leo Schofield
 John So
 Ninian Stephen
 Shane Warne

References

Organisations based in Melbourne